The Ogden/Weber Municipal Building, at 2541 Washington Blvd. in Ogden, Utah, was built in 1938–1940.  It was listed on the National Register of Historic Places in 1983.

It was funded as a Public Works Administration project.  It was designed by architects Hodgson and McClenahan in Art Deco style and built by George A. Whitmeyer & Sons.  It is built of warm brick and glazed terra cotta.

Its nomination claims that "In many ways it is a 'typical' Art Deco example, resembling the Syracuse Lighting Company Office Building (1932), in Syracuse, New York", but frankly it is a great deal less spectacular than that extraordinary example.

References

External links

National Register of Historic Places in Weber County, Utah
Art Deco architecture in Utah
Buildings and structures completed in 1939